Domenico Maria Muratori (1662–1744) was an Italian painter of the late seventeenth and early eighteenth century, specializing in altarpieces.

Muratori was born in Vendrana in the Budrio commune. He was a Bolognese painter who studied under Lorenzo Pasinelli. His wife Teresa Scannabecchi was also a painter. They met in the studio of Giovanni Gioseffo dal Sole, where she was also a student. Muratori specialized in religious-themed works. He produced frescoes for the second chapel of San Francesco a Ripa. He died in Rome in 1744.

References

 Storia pittorica dell'Italia dal risorgimento delle belle arti fin presso al fine del XVIII secolo (1822), p. 149.

1662 births
1744 deaths
17th-century Italian painters
Italian male painters
18th-century Italian painters
Painters from Bologna
18th-century Italian male artists